Gunvor Margareta Pontén (11 February 1929 – 16 February 2023) was a Swedish actress who graduated from Dramatens elevskola in 1954. She appeared in over 50 films and television shows starting in 1949. She starred in the film Leva på 'Hoppet', which won the Silver Bear (Comedies) award at the 1st Berlin International Film Festival.

Gunvor Pontén was the daughter of Ruben Pontén and Dagny Carlqvist. She was also a cousin of fashion designer Gunilla Pontén and actor Tomas Pontén. After graduating in 1948 she started acting school at Terserus teaterskola 1948–1950, and Dramatens elevskola 1951–1954. She worked within the field of acting at Stadsteatern, Folkteatern in Gothenburg and Oscarsteatern.

Pontén died on 16 February 2023, at the age of 94.

Filmography

2019 - Toy Story 4 (voice)
2017 - Vaiana  (voice)
2013 - Tyskungen
2013 - Orion
2009 - Psalm 21
2006 - Kärringen därnere
2001 - Atlantis: The Lost Empire (voice)
1997 - Tic Tac
1993 - Glädjekällan
1993 - Drömkåken
1993 - Lotta flyttar hemifrån 
1993 - Brandbilen som försvann'
1984 - Splittring1983 - Raskenstam1981 - Göta kanal eller Vem drog ur proppen? 
1980 - Lämna mej inte ensam1975 - Ungkarlshotellet1974 - Vita nejlikan eller Den barmhärtige sybariten1971 - Lockfågeln1961 - Rififi in Stockholm1957 - Enslingen Johannes1956 - Egen ingång1955 - The Unicorn1955 - Violence 
1955 - Flottans muntergökar1955 -  The Dance Hall 
1955 - Karusellen i fjällen1955 - Mord, lilla vän1954 - Young Summer1954 -  Our Father and the Gypsy 
1953 - The Glass Mountain1953 - The Chieftain of Göinge 
1953 - Resan till dej1953 - I dur och skur 
1952 - 69:an, sergeanten och jag1951 - Hon dansade en sommar1951 - Living on 'Hope'1950 - Den vita katten1949 - Playing Truant''

References

External links

1929 births
2023 deaths
Swedish stage actresses
Swedish film actresses
Actresses from Stockholm
20th-century Swedish actresses